Akimenko (Russian or Ukrainian: Акименко) is a gender-neutral Slavic surname that may refer to
Andrei Akimenko (born 1979), Russian football player 
Mikhail Akimenko (born 1995), Russian high jumper
Vladyslav Akimenko (born 1953), Soviet competition sailor

See also
 

Russian-language surnames
Ukrainian-language surnames